The Concours Géza Anda is a triennial international piano competition in Zürich, Switzerland. It was founded in memory of Hungarian pianist Géza Anda by his widow Hortense Anda-Bührle. The purpose of the competition is to discover and promote young pianists who will pass on the musical spirit of Géza Anda. The Géza Anda Foundation provides winners with free concert management for three years after the competition (up to 200 engagements).

Winners

References
 List of prize-winners at Concours Géza Anda [until 2009, the date of publication], p. 81, in: Géza Anda, the Troubadour of Piano (dissertation by Judit Kertész, Franz Liszt Academy of Music, 2011)

External links
 Official website
 Directory of International Piano Competitions
 Piano Competitions & Music Competitions at Bakitone International

Culture of Zürich
Piano competitions